The abbreviation WAFC can refer to:

In sport:
 Waihopai AFC
 Waiuku AFC
 Waltham Abbey F.C.
 Warkworth AFC
 Wellington Amateurs F.C.
 West Australian Football Commission
 Wigan Athletic Football Club
 Willington A.F.C.
 Winnipeg Alliance FC
 Whitchurch Alport F.C.
 Witton Albion Football Club
 Woolwich Arsenal Football Club, the former name of Arsenal Football Club
 Workington A.F.C.

Other uses:
 WAFC (AM), a radio station (590 AM) licensed to serve Clewiston, Florida, United States
 WLMX (FM), a radio station (106.1 FM) licensed to serve Okeechobee, Florida, which held the call sign WAFC-FM from 2010 to 2019
 WLLY-FM, a radio station (99.5 FM) licensed to serve Clewiston, Florida, which held the call sign WAFC-FM from 1984 to 2010
 World Area Forecast Center

See also
 WFC (disambiguation)
 AFCW